The Itanda Falls are rapids on the White Nile river in Uganda.  They are a challenge for kayakers, being graded at the highest level of difficulty.

References

Jinja District
Rapids
Waterfalls of Uganda